Józef Adamiec (born 10 May 1954) is a Polish football defender.

References

1954 births
Living people
Polish footballers
Association football defenders
Odra Opole players
Lech Poznań players
Wormatia Worms players
Ekstraklasa players
I liga players
II liga players
Poland international footballers
Polish expatriate footballers
Expatriate footballers in Germany
Polish expatriate sportspeople in Germany